Salebriaria annulosella is a species of snout moth. It is found in North America, where it has been recorded from Florida, Georgia, Illinois, Indiana, Maine, Mississippi, North Carolina, Oklahoma, South Carolina and Texas.

References

Moths described in 1887
Phycitinae
Moths of North America